The Female Quixote; or, The Adventures of Arabella is a novel written by Charlotte Lennox imitating and parodying the ideas of Miguel de Cervantes' Don Quixote. Published in 1752, two years after she wrote her first novel, The Life of Harriot Stuart, it was her best-known and most-celebrated work. It was approved by both Henry Fielding and Samuel Richardson, applauded by Samuel Johnson, and used as a model by Jane Austen for Northanger Abbey. It has been called a burlesque, "satirical harlequinade", and a depiction of the real power of females. While some dismissed Arabella as a coquette who simply used romance as a tool, Scott Paul Gordon said that she "exercises immense power without any consciousness of doing so". Norma Clarke has ranked it with Clarissa, Tom Jones and Roderick Random as one of the "defining texts in the development of the novel in the eighteenth century".

Plot 
Arabella, the heroine of the novel, was brought up by her widowed father in a remote English castle, where she reads many French romance novels, and imagining them to be historically accurate, expects her life to be equally adventurous and romantic. When her father died, he declared that she would lose part of her estate if she did not marry her cousin Glanville. After imagining wild fantasies for herself in the country, she visits Bath and London. Glanville is concerned at her mistaken ideas, but continues to love her, while Sir George Bellmour, his friend, attempts to court her in the same chivalric language and high-flown style as in the novels. When she throws herself into Thames in an attempt to flee from horsemen whom she mistakes to be "ravishers" in an imitation of Clélie, she becomes weak and ill. This action might have been inspired by the French satire The Mock-Clielia, in which the heroine "rode at full speed towards the great Canal which she took for the Tyber, and wherein to she threw herself, that she might swim over in imitation of Clelia whom she believed herself to be". This leads to Arabella falling ill, upon which a doctor is called to take care of her. It is then that the doctor learns of Arabella's delusions concerning romance, and explains to her the difference between literature and reality. As a result, she finally decides to accept Glanville's hand in marriage.

Critical reception 

The critical reception of The Female Quixote was generally favourable: its plot and elevated language, moral vision, and witty commentaries on romance novels were applauded. Fielding's Covent-Garden Journal gave a favorable notice of her book. Dr. Johnson gave a party in honor of her first novel, The Life of Harriot Stuart, in which he served a "magnificent hot  this he would have stuck with bay-leaves," and "further, he had prepared for her a crown of laurel, with which, but not till he had invoked the muses by some ceremonies of his own invention, he encircled her brows". He was much taken with her work and supportive of The Female Quixote. However, Mrs. Barbauld criticized that it was "rather spun out too much, and not very well wound up."

Critics have debated whether the last chapter of The Female Quixote was written by Lennox herself or Samuel Johnson, due to its stylistic differences that appeared to be similar to Johnson's own writing, that stand out from the other chapters of the book. Margaret Dalziel, editor of the 1970 edition of The Female Quixote, mentioned characteristics which she believed to be of Johnson's in a two-page note in the heading of chapter eleven in book nine. However, in the appendix of the same edition, Duncan Isles rejected the claim, saying that the claim rested too much on subjective stylistic evidence. Other factors that suggest Johnson as the author of the last chapter include various typesetting differences. However, the errors have been attributed to various factors, including Lennox's difficulty to complete the last chapters, which likely would have led to her submitting them late to the printing press, resulting in the typeset errors.

References

External links
 
 

1752 novels
18th-century British novels
Scottish novels
Parody novels
Novels based on Don Quixote
Novels by Charlotte Lennox